In Person is a live album by American jazz pianist Bobby Timmons recorded in 1961 at the Village Vanguard and released on the Riverside label.

Reception
The Allmusic review by Jim Todd stated: "This enjoyable LP presents a relaxed, agreeable live date, but not one that generates sparks".

Track listing
All compositions by Bobby Timmons except as indicated
 "Autumn Leaves" (Joseph Kosma, Johnny Mercer, Jacques Prévert) - 7:57 
 "So Tired" - 6:24 
 "Goodbye" (Gordon Jenkins) - 4:46 
 "Dat Dere (Theme)" - 0:56 
 "They Didn't Believe Me" (Jerome Kern, Herbert Reynolds) - 6:48 Bonus track on CD reissue 
 "Dat Dere" (Full-length) - 4:31 Bonus track on CD reissue 
 "Popsy" - 6:12 
 "I Didn't Know What Time It Was" (Lorenz Hart, Richard Rodgers) - 8:14 
 "Softly, As in a Morning Sunrise" (Oscar Hammerstein II, Sigmund Romberg) - 5:30 
 "Dat Dere (Theme)" - 0:56 
Recorded at the Village Vanguard in New York City on October 1, 1961.

Personnel
Bobby Timmons - piano   
Ron Carter - bass 
Albert Heath - drums

References

Riverside Records live albums
Bobby Timmons albums
1960 live albums
Albums produced by Orrin Keepnews
Albums recorded at the Village Vanguard